Buck Township is one of fifteen townships in Edgar County, Illinois, USA.  As of the 2010 census, its population was 307 and it contained 145 housing units.  Buck Township was originally named Pilot Grove Township, but the name was changed on May 9, 1857.

Geography

Cities, towns, villages
 Redmon

Extinct towns
 Mays

Major highways
  Illinois Route 133

Demographics

School districts
 Kansas Community Unit School District 3
 Paris Community Unit School District 4
 Shiloh Community Unit School District 1

Political districts
 Illinois's 15th congressional district
 State House District 109
 State Senate District 55

References
 
 United States Census Bureau 2007 TIGER/Line Shapefiles
 United States National Atlas

External links
 City-Data.com
 Illinois State Archives

Townships in Edgar County, Illinois
Populated places established in 1856
Townships in Illinois
1856 establishments in Illinois